Bečići (Cyrillic: Бечићи) is a town in the municipality of Budva, Montenegro. It is located south-east of Budva, and has 895 permanent residents (2011 census).

Overview
It has a 1,950-metre-long sandy beach along the southern Adriatic. In 1935 it won the Grand Prix in Paris as the most beautiful beach in Europe. Several sections of the beach are private and are only accessible to the hotel guests. In contrast to Budva's large number of private housing units, Bečići town mostly consists of medium and large hotels. Some of them, such as the Mediteran, Iberostar Bellevue and Queen of Montenegro have been extensively refurbished, while the most significant greenfield addition was the Hotel Splendid, a luxurious five-star resort that cost 70 million euros to build. It was the choice of The Rolling Stones and Madonna as well as Brad Pitt and Angelina Jolie during their stay in Montenegro.

Demographics
According to the 2011 census, its population was 895.

References

External links

Populated places in Budva Municipality
Beaches of Montenegro